Cameron Alexander (born 31 May 1997) is a Canadian World Cup alpine ski racer and specializes in the speed events of downhill and super-G. He made his World Cup debut at age 22 at Lake Louise in November 2019, and gained his first victory (and podium) in a downhill at Kvitfjell in March 2022.

Alexander won the bronze medal in the downhill at the World Championships in 2023.

Career
During his career he has achieved 4 results among the top 15 in the World Cup.

World Cup results

Season standings

Top ten finishes
 1 win (1 DH)
 1 podium (1 DH), 3 top tens (3 DH)

World Championship results

References

External links

1997 births
Living people
Canadian male alpine skiers